The Victoria Cross and George Cross Association is made up of holders of the Victoria Cross (VC), Britain's highest military award for bravery in the field, and the George Cross (GC), the equivalent award for civilians and military personnel who have displayed conspicuous bravery not in the face of the enemy.

Holders of these awards receive a civil pension and attend reunions which receive much coverage in the national press. Membership is dwindling due to the increasing age of the VC and GC recipients and the tendency until recently of the government to award these medals posthumously.

Canon William Lummis was the chaplain to the Association owing to his extensive research into the Victoria Cross.

The Victoria Cross and George Cross Association is Headquartered in London at Horse Guards Parade, Whitehall SW1A 2AX, United Kingdom.

Officers of the VC and GC Association

Patron
 Queen Elizabeth II, 1957-2022.

President
 Sir Winston Churchill , 1959–1965.
 Brigadier Sir John Smyth, 1st Baronet  , 1965–1983.
 Queen Elizabeth The Queen Mother, 1983–2002.
 King Charles III, since 2003.

Vice president
 Major Viscount De L'Isle , 1983–1991.
 Lieutenant Sir Roden Cutler , 1991–2002.
 Major Sir Tasker Watkins , 2002–2007.

Chairman
 Brigadier Sir John Smyth, 1st Baronet , 1957–1971. 
 Rear Admiral Godfrey Place , 1971–1994.
 Colonel Stuart Archer , 1994–2006.
 Chief Superintendent Jim Beaton , 2006–2014.
 Major Peter Norton , 2014–2022.
 Lance Corporal of Horse Christopher Finney , 2022–Present.

Secretary
 Mrs. Didy Grahame , 1970–1972, 1981–2014. 
 Mrs. Rebecca Maciejewski, 2014–present.

Chaplain
 Canon William Lummis , 1956–1985.

See also
List of living George Cross recipients

References

External links
Official Victoria Cross & George Cross Association website
The Victoria Cross and George Cross Reunions

Victoria Cross
George Cross